Joseph John Ruocco (April 22, 1922 – July 26, 1980) was a Roman Catholic bishop.

Born in Boston, Massachusetts, Ruocco was ordained to the priesthood for the Roman Catholic Archdiocese of Boston on May 6, 1948. On December 28, 1974, Ruocco was appointed titular bishop of Polinianum and auxiliary bishop of the Boston Archdiocese and was ordained on February 11, 1975.

Notes

1922 births
1980 deaths
Clergy from Boston
20th-century American Roman Catholic titular bishops
Roman Catholic Archdiocese of Boston